The 2018 Ken Galluccio Cup was the 10th edition of the Ken Galluccio Cup, the European men's lacrosse club competition.

Poynton achieved their first title ever.

Competition format
The ten teams were divided into two groups of five, where the two first qualified teams joined the semifinals.

Group stage

Group A

Group B

Championship bracket

Fifth-position bracket

Ninth-position game

References

External links
Official website
Competition at Pointbench.com

Ken Galluccio Cup
2018 in lacrosse
Ken Galluccio Cup